Fatima bint Muhammad al-Fihriya al-Qurashiyya, known in shorter form as Fatima al-Fihriya or Fatima al-Fihri, was an Arab woman who is credited with founding the al-Qarawiyyin Mosque in 857–859 AD in Fez, Morocco. Al-Fihriya died around 880 AD. The al-Qarawiyyin Mosque subsequently developed into a teaching institution, which became the modern University of al-Qarawiyyin in 1963. Her story is told by Ibn Abi Zar' (d. between 1310 and 1320) in The Garden of Pages (Rawd al-Qirtas) as founder of the mosque. Since she was first mentioned many centuries after her death, her story has been hard to substantiate and some modern historians doubt she ever existed.

Life

Story according to traditional accounts 
Little is known about her personal life, except for what was recorded by 14th century historian Ibn Abi-Zar’. Fatima was born around 800 AD in the town of Kairouan, in present-day Tunisia. She is of Arab Qurayshi descent, hence the nisba "al-Qurashiyya", 'the Qurayshi one'. Her family was part of a large migration to Fez from Kairouan. Although her family did not start out wealthy, her father, Mohammed al-Fihri, became a successful merchant. When he died, this wealth was inherited by Fatima, and her sister Maryam. It is with this money that they went on to leave their legacy. Al-Fihriya was married, but both her husband and father died shortly after the wedding. Her father left his wealth to both Fatima and her sister, his only children. She and her sister Maryam were well-educated and studied the Islamic jurisprudence Fiqh and the Hadith, or the records of Prophet Muhammed. Both went on to found mosques in Fes: Fatima founded Al-Qarawiyyin and Maryam founded the Al-Andalusiyyin Mosque. This idea was spurred on by the fact that due to all the Muslims fleeing like Fatima and her family, they were all gathering immigrants that were devout worshippers keen on learning and studying their faith. With as many immigrants as there were, there was overcrowding and not enough space, resources, or teachers to accommodate them.

Historicity 
The historicity of this story has been questioned by some modern historians who see the symmetry of two sisters founding the two most famous mosques of Fes as too convenient and likely originating from legend. Ibn Abi Zar is also judged by contemporary historians to be a relatively unreliable source. Historian Roger Le Tourneau doubts the truth of the traditional account of Fatima building the Qarawiyyin mosque and her sister Maryam building the Andalusiyyin Mosque. He notes that the perfect parallelism of two sisters and two mosques is too good to be true, and likely a pious legend. Jonathan Bloom, a scholar of Islamic architecture, also notes the unlikelihood of the parallelisms. He states that the traditional story of the founding of the mosque belongs more to myth than to academic history and points out that no part of the mosque today is older than the tenth century.

One of the biggest challenges to the traditional story is a foundation inscription that was rediscovered during renovations to the mosque in the 20th century, previously hidden under layers of plaster for centuries. This inscription, carved onto cedar wood panels and written in a Kufic script very similar to foundation inscriptions in 9th-century Tunisia, was found on a wall above the probable site of the mosque's original mihrab (prior to the building's later expansions). The inscription, recorded and deciphered by Gaston Deverdun, proclaims the foundation of "this mosque" by Dawud ibn Idris (a son of Idris II who governed this region of Morocco at the time) in Dhu al-Qadah 263 AH (July–August of 877 CE). Deverdun suggested the inscription may have come from another unidentified mosque and was moved here at a later period (probably 15th or 16th century) when the veneration of the Idrisids was resurgent in Fes and such relics would have held enough religious significance to be reused in this way. However, scholar Chafik Benchekroun argued more recently that a more likely explanation is that this inscription is the original foundation inscription of the Qarawiyyin Mosque itself and that it might have been covered up in the 12th century just before the arrival of the Almohads in the city. Based on this evidence and on the many doubts about Ibn Abi Zar's narrative, he argues that Fatima al-Fihriya is quite possibly a legendary figure rather than a historical one.

Founding of Al-Qarawiyyin Mosque

According to Ibn Abi Zar', Fatima used the money inherited from her father to build the Al-Qarawiyyin Mosque, named for the immigrants from her city. When Fatima's community outgrew the mosque, she purchased a mosque built around 845 AD under the supervision of King Yahya ibn Muhammad and rebuilt it, doubling its size.

The construction project was supervised by Fatima herself. As Tunisian historian Hassan Hosni Abdelwahab noted in his book Famous Tunisian Women: "She committed to only using the land she had purchased. She dug deep into the land, unearthing yellow sand, plaster, and stone to use, so as not to draw suspicion from others [for using too many resources]".

The mosque took 18 years to construct. According to Moroccan historian Abdelhadi Tazi, Al-Fihriya fasted until the project's completion. When it was finished, she went inside and prayed to God, thanking him for his blessings. She named it after the immigrants from her hometown of Kairouan. 

According to tradition, Fatima's sister, Mariam, also founded a similar mosque in the district across the river around the same time (859–60), with help from local Andalusian families, which became known as the Al-Andalusiyyin Mosque (Mosque of the Andalusians).

References

Further reading
 

9th-century Arabs
People from Fez, Morocco
People from Kairouan
880 deaths
University of al-Qarawiyyin
9th-century women
Fihrids
9th-century people from the Abbasid Caliphate